Creek County is a county located in the U.S. state of Oklahoma. As of the 2010 census, the population was 69,967. Its county seat is Sapulpa.

Creek County is part of the Tulsa, OK Metropolitan Statistical Area.

History
European explorers traveled through this area early in the 19th Century, after the Louisiana Purchase. In 1825, the Osage Nation ceded the territory where the Federal Government planned to resettle the Creek Nation and other tribes after their expulsion from the Southeastern part of the United States. The Creeks began migrating into this area, where they and their black slaves settled to begin farming and raising cattle. In 1835, Federal soldiers under Captain J. L. Dawson built the Dawson Road, following an old Osage hunting trail.

Railroads gave an important boost to the local economy. In 1886, the Atlantic and Pacific Railroad built a line from Red Fork to Sapulpa. In 1898, the St. Louis and Oklahoma City Railway Company (later the St. Louis–San Francisco Railway), connected Sapulpa and Oklahoma City.

The present Creek County was established at the time of statehood, with a population of 18,365. The town of Sapulpa was initially designated as the county seat. This decision was challenged by supporters of the town of Bristow. An election held August 12, 1908 to choose a permanent seat was won by Sapulpa, but the dispute did not end there. After a series of court cases, the Oklahoma Supreme Court ruled in favor of Sapulpa on August 1, 1913.

After oil was discovered at Glenn Pool in adjacent Tulsa County in 1905, other strikes occurred in Creek County. The Cushing-Drumright Oil Field opened in 1912, creating boom towns Drumright, Kiefer and Oilton. By 1920, the county population had increased to 62,480.

Geography
It is drained by the Cimarron River, and the Deep Fork and Little Deep Fork of the North Canadian River. Heyburn Lake is contained within the county. Keystone Lake is partially within Creek County.

Major highways

  Interstate 44
  US Highway 75 ALT
  State Highway 16
  State Highway 33
  State Highway 48
  State Highway 51
  State Highway 66 
  State Highway 99
  State Highway 117

Adjacent counties
 Pawnee County (north)
 Tulsa County (east)
 Okmulgee County (southeast)
 Okfuskee County (south)
 Lincoln County (west)
 Payne County (northwest)

Demographics

As of the census of 2000, there were 67,367 people, 25,289 households, and 19,017 families residing in the county.  The population density was 70 people per square mile (27/km2).  There were 27,986 housing units at an average density of 29 per square mile (11/km2).  The racial makeup of the county was 82.27% White, 2.56% Black or African American, 9.08% Native American, 0.27% Asian, 0.03% Pacific Islander, 0.63% from other races, and 5.16% from two or more races.  1.90% of the population were Hispanic or Latino of any race.

There were 25,289 households, out of which 34.80% had children under the age of 18 living with them, 60.10% were married couples living together, 10.90% had a female householder with no husband present, and 24.80% were non-families. 21.60% of all households were made up of individuals, and 9.40% had someone living alone who was 65 years of age or older.  The average household size was 2.64 and the average family size was 3.06.

In the county, the population was spread out, with 27.40% under the age of 18, 8.00% from 18 to 24, 27.30% from 25 to 44, 24.50% from 45 to 64, and 12.80% who were 65 years of age or older.  The median age was 37 years. For every 100 females, there were 96.00 males.  For every 100 females age 18 and over, there were 92.90 males.

The median income for a household in the county was $33,168, and the median income for a family was $38,470. Males had a median income of $31,190 versus $21,690 for females. The per capita income for the county was $16,191.  About 8% of families and 13.50% of the population were below the poverty line, including 17.20% of those under age 18 and 14.10% of those age 65 or over.

Politics

Political culture

Communities

Cities
 Bristow
 Drumright (partly in Payne County)
 Mannford
 Oilton
 Sapulpa (county seat) (partly in Tulsa County)

Towns
 Depew
 Kellyville
 Kiefer
 Lawrence Creek
 Mounds
 Shamrock
 Slick

Census-designated place
 Oakhurst (partly in Tulsa County)

Other unincorporated communities
 Bowden
 Gypsy
 Hilton
 Milfay
 Olive
 Silver City

NRHP sites

References

External links
 www.creekcountyonline.com The official county government website
 Encyclopedia of Oklahoma History and Culture - Creek County
 Oklahoma Digital Maps: Digital Collections of Oklahoma and Indian Territory

 
Tulsa metropolitan area
1907 establishments in Oklahoma
Populated places established in 1907